Houison is a surname. Notable people with the surname include:

 Andrew Houison (1850–1912), Australian medical practitioner, amateur historian, and philatelist
 Rod Houison, English musician, producer, and sound engineer

See also
 Howison